Vilmos Földes (sometimes transliterated as Foeldes or occasionally Foldes; born 16 December 1984) is a Hungarian professional Pocket billiards (pool) player.

Based in Pécs, Hungary's fifth-largest city, Földes competed in the 2006 WPA World Nine-ball Championship in which he survived the group stages and the round of 64, but was eliminated in the round of 32 by Luong Chi Dung. In the 2007 World Nine-ball Championship he reached the semifinals but was defeated by Daryl Peach. Földes has also competed in the World Pool Masters Tournament.

Titles
 2022 Andy Mercer Memorial 9-Ball 
 2020 Andy Mercer Memorial 9-Ball
 2019 Andy Mercer Memorial 9-Ball 
 2019 Jay Swanson Memorial 9-Ball
 2016 Chuck Markulis Memorial 9-Ball
 2003 WPA World Nine-ball Junior championship

References

External links
 Player profile on azbilliards.com
 Photograph of Földes at World Pool Masters

Hungarian pool players
Sportspeople from Pécs
Living people
1984 births
Place of birth missing (living people)
World champions in pool